(published in English as The Woman Trap), is a science fiction graphic novel from 1986 written and illustrated by the Yugoslavian born cartoonist and storyteller Enki Bilal. It is the second part of the Nikopol Trilogy, started by La Foire aux immortels (The Carnival of Immortals) from 1980 and ending with Froid Équateur (Equator Cold) in 1992.

Plot

The story centers around Jill Bioskop, a journalist woman with blue hair and white skin whose story becomes involved with that of Alcide Nikopol and the Egyptian god Horus. The story continues two years after Nikopol is admitted to a psychiatric hospital in Paris. Nikopol suddenly stops quoting Baudelaire after the discovery of a block of concrete, which contains the immortal body of Horus.

At the same time in London, Jill is working on an article about the Afro-Pakistian and Zuben'Ubisch minority conflicts in the suburbs of Chelsea. While working on her Script-Walker she receives a phone call from John, an Alpheratzish friend and informant. During that phone call John is murdered by four Afro-Pakistiani but before he dies, he tells Jill about an article in De Morgen. After having made her way to the phonebooth and discovered John's body, Jill returns to her hotel room where she takes two red pills of HLV, John's drug.  The drug erases John from Jill's memory.

Meanwhile, the news media are reporting about the block of concrete and the liberation of Horus, which was followed by the brutal murder of the workers who freed him onboard of the space vessel Europe I. Upon hearing this news, Jeff Wynatt, a friend of Jill Bioskop and former journalist, hurries towards the hotel where Jill is staying. He finds her in a deep coma and wakes her with cold water. Afterwards during a dinner in a restaurant Jeff asks Jill to cover the news of the return of Europe I, which is expected to arrive in a few days in Berlin. Jeff also says that he might visit Jill once she is in Berlin, which is something she didn't want to hear. Later that evening in the hotel room Jill uses the antenna of the scripwalker to kill Jeff. After she has cleaned up, she takes another red HLV pill to erase everything from her memory.

Alcide Nikopol Jr. receives a report from his father's psychiatrist which says that Nikopol has fully recovered from his alleged mental illness, but that he hasn't accepted the fact yet. However, Nikopol is shown to cover the room observation camera while making a deal with the nurse about taking his pills for a kiss, which can be interpreted in several ways.

Jill travels with an air taxi to Berlin and during the flight she discovers in her pocket the news paper article that John had told her about before he was murdered. She also learns that what she is writing on her scriptwalker is printed on an old fax at the editorial office of De Morgen.

The other Egyptian gods and the pyramid are somewhere in the neighbourhood of Mars when they discover that the pyramid is missing a block of concrete. Exactly the piece of concrete which was used for Horus's punishment.

Jill arrives at Mauer Palast Hotel in Berlin and says goodbye to Nick, the taxi driver. When she walks through the lobby of the hotel she feels Nick's eyes. On her room she orders dinner and reviews the notes from the scriptwalker. During the night Nick tries to sneak into Jill's bed which results in another murder with the antenna of the scriptwalker followed by a red pill.

The next day Jill meets another journalist, Ivan Vabek, and they drink a cup of coffee in the bar of the hotel. Ivan tells about a conflict in Berlin called the Egg War, of which he thinks every journalist must cover at least once in his or her career. He offers Jill a front row spot and a dinner invitation. Jill accepts the invitation and is transported by a local boy to the spot where she can watch the Egg War herself.

Next evening Jill tries to get access to the space port of Berlin, but everybody is denied access. The government inquires the only survivor of Europe I which is in fact controlled by Horus. Horus leaves the human body of the survivor he had taken and murders everybody who was questioning him. He finds Ivan Vabek and takes control of his body. Nikopol has followed these events with his telepathic cat and is preparing to leave the hospital and travel to Berlin. Also travelling to Berlin is John, Jill's alien friend who was murdered in the beginning of the story.

During a dinner with Ivan, Jill notices that something has changed in him, especially his voice. While in Ivan's room, Ivan is fighting the spirit of Horus resulting in Horus leaving his body. Once more Jill is left back with another dead body and the usual red pill to erase it from her memory.

Nikopol arrives at the desk of Mauer Palast, and he asks for a room. Once in the room, Nikopol speaks to Horus asking him to appear. Horus appears and during a glass of champagne, they discuss an agreement.

John is arriving in the railway station of Berlin, where the police demands him to come with them. John knocks down three police men and flees, but is shot in the back three times...

Publication history
La Femme piège was initially published by Dargaud in 1986, and later reissued by Les Humanoïdes Associés in 1990. An English translation was first published by the now defunct publishing house Catalan Communications in 1988, and the most recent translation published by Humanoids Publishing in 1999 contains all three volumes of the Nikopol Trilogy.

Certain special edition issues of the album also contained 4 newspaper pages written by Jill Bioskop, reporting from the future, for newspapers Libération and De Morgen in the French and Belgian editions respectively. The contents were extra background information about certain aspects which are kept obscured in the graphic novel.

Footnotes

Sources
 Nikopol publications Bedetheque

External links
Nikopol Trilogy English translation on Humanoids Publishing

1986 graphic novels
1986 comics debuts
Comics by Enki Bilal
French graphic novels
Science fiction comics
2
Comics set in the 2020s